Tamrookum Creek is a rural locality in the Scenic Rim Region, Queensland, Australia.

History 
The name Tamrookum is thought to be a corruption of the Aboriginal words (Bundjalung language, Yugumbir dialect) dhan/buragun meaning place of boomerangs.

Timber was an important early industry in the area. There was a sawmill at Tamrookum Creek. This sawmill no longer exists.

References 

Scenic Rim Region
Localities in Queensland